Neyasar District is a district (bakhsh) in Kashan County, Isfahan Province, Iran. At the 2006 census, its population was 9,000, in 2,873 families.  The District has one city: Neyasar.  The District has two rural districts (dehestan): Kuh Dasht Rural District and Neyasar Rural District.

References 

Kashan County
Districts of Isfahan Province